Eclipse, The Magazine (or simply Eclipse) was a black-and-white comics anthology magazine published by Eclipse Comics from 1981 to 1983. The magazine introduced several new characters and series — including Coyote, Ms. Tree, and Masked Man — that would get published in collections and new series by Eclipse and others.

Many of the features from Eclipse were carried over into the color anthology Eclipse Monthly, which ran from August 1983 to July 1984.

Features 
 Coyote by Steve Englehart and Marshall Rogers
 Ms. Tree by Max Allan Collins and Terry Beatty
 Masked Man by B. C. Boyer
Static by Steve Ditko
 Dope by Sax Rohmer; adapted by Trina Robbins
 Ragamuffins by Don McGregor and Gene Colan

Issues 
 (May 1981) Intro Ms. Tree and Static
 (July 1981) Intro Coyote.  First Dope by Sax Rohmer, adapted by Trina Robbins; Ms. Tree — part one of "Role Model/Caring, Sharing, and Helping Others," about the hypocrisy of censorship, by Steve Gerber and Val Mayerik
 (Nov 1981) Intro Ragamuffins by Don McGregor and Gene Colan; Coyote, Dope, Ms. Tree — part two of "Role Model/Caring, Sharing, and Helping Others"
 (Jan 1982) Feat. Coyote, Dope, Ms. Tree
 (March 1982) Feat. Ragamuffins, Dope, Coyote, Ms. Tree
 (July 1982) Feat. Dope, Coyote, Ms. Tree
 (Nov 1982) Intro Masked Man; Dope, Coyote
 (Jan 1983) Feat. Masked Man, Dope, Coyote, Ragamuffins

References

1981 comics debuts
Comics anthologies
Comics by Don McGregor
Comics by Steve Englehart
Defunct American comics